Our Lady of Beauraing (also known as the Virgin of the Golden Heart) is the title of 32 Marian apparitions reported in Beauraing, Belgium, between November 1932 and January 1933 by five children whose ages ranged between 9 and 15. For several years after the apparitions, pilgrims flocked to the small town of Beauraing, province of Namur (Belgium), and many cures were claimed. She is celebrated under this title on 29 November.

Apparitions
Some young people who claimed to have seen the apparitions were Fernande (15), Gilberte (13), and Albert (11), children of Hector and Marie-Louise Perpète Voisin. Hector Voisin was a railway clerk. With them were Andrée (14) and Gilberte (9) Degeimbre, daughters of  Degeimbre, a farmer's widow.

On the evening of 29 November 1932, four of the children walked to a school conducted by the Sisters of Christian Doctrine to meet Gilberte Voisin and walk home with her. When they reached the school, Albert pointed  out a lady dressed in a long white robe, walking in the air over a railroad viaduct just past the school. The other children reported seeing her as well. Over the next several weeks, they saw the lady thirty-two more times, generally in the garden of the convent-school. The final apparition was on 3 January 1933. 

The children reported that the lady requested that a chapel be built at the site and stated that "I am the Immaculate Virgin". She also desired for pilgrims to come to the site and asked the children (and everyone) to "pray, pray, pray" and, in one of the last visions, revealed her "Golden Heart".

In the final vision, the Lady asked one of the children, Fernande, "Do you love My Son?" and she replied, "Yes". She then asked her "Do you love Me?" and Fernande again answered, "Yes". The Lady then stated, "Then sacrifice yourself for me" and bade them farewell before the child could reply.

Ecclesiastical review
In 1935, the Bishop of Namur, Thomas-Louis Heylen, appointed an Episcopal Commission to investigate the events. The work continued under his successor, Bishop André-Marie Charue. On 2 February 1943, he published a decree authorizing public devotions to Our Lady of Beauraing.

The final approbation for the Marian apparition was granted in 1949 with the permission of the Holy Office.

In 1949 in Lowell, Massachusetts, the Pro Maria Committee was founded by Joseph Debergh, O.M.I. to disseminate the story of Our Lady's thirty-three appearances in Beauraing. The committee created an archive of photographs of the history and activities relating to the apparitions, now housed at The Marian Library/International Marian Research Institute.

After the apparitions, the five children all grew up, married, and lived quiet lives with their families. Pope John Paul II visited Beauraing on 18 May 1985.

Notes

Sources
 Shrine of Our Lady of Beauraing

External links
Sanctuary of Our Lady of Beauraing

Beauraing
Beauraing
Shrines to the Virgin Mary
1932 in Belgium
1933 in Belgium